The Krasnodar Trial was a war crimes trial that was held in front of a military tribunal in July 1943 in Krasnodar, Soviet Union. All of the defendants had been Soviets who collaborated with Germany. All 11 defendants were accused of treason for collaborating with the Nazi German military, police and SS forces, which were responsible for implementing the occupational policies during the German–Soviet War (1941–1945). The trial was the first war crimes trial of World War II.

Units of the German Wehrmacht occupied Krasnodar between August 12, 1942 and February 12, 1943. German forces, including the Einsatzgruppen (mobile death squads), killed approximately 7,000 civilians including Jews and Communists. Shooting, hanging, burning and gas vans were used.

The tribunal heard the case against 11 defendants, all of whom were Russian and Ukrainian collaborators with the German military, police and SS forces. They were accused in participating in the murder of 7,000 people. All but one of the defendants had joined Sonderkommando 10a, a subunit of the death squad Einsatzgruppe D. The sole exception was Mikhail Lastovina, a kulak who had managed to avoid capture during the 1930s dekulakization.

The prosecutors emphasised the collective responsibility of the Nazi regime for the crimes, not just the local commanders. All of the accused pleaded guilty and begged the court to spare their lives to have a chance to atone. They were each officially pronounced guilty and sentenced on July 17, 1943.

Eight of the defendants were sentenced to death. The other three were deemed to have had relatively-minor roles and were instead ordered to serve 20 years of hard labor in gulags. The following morning, the condemned defendants were publicly hanged together in the Krasnodar town square. Approximately 30,000 people, including children, witnessed the executions. Many of them started applauding.

The Soviet press gave wide publicity to the trials. Foreign observers considered the trial to be "stage-managed". The British journalist Alexander Werth called the trial "first-rate hate propaganda" that was intended to emphasize the suffering of Soviet civilians under the German occupation. However, nobody doubted the severity or the extent of the crimes or the guilt of the defendants. Even in the Soviet Union, some noted that the massacre of the 7,000 civilians in Krasnodar was actually a relatively-minor incident in comparison what the Germans and collaborators were doing elsewhere in the country. One major objective of the trial was to deter future collaboration.

References

1943 in law
1943 in the Soviet Union
Trials in Russia
Holocaust trials
War crimes trials in the Soviet Union
War crimes of the Wehrmacht